Rodney William Carr (born 9 October 1968) is an Australian professional welter/light middle/middle/super middle/light heavy/cruiserweight boxer of the 1980s and '90s who won the Oriental and Pacific Boxing Federation (OPBF) super middleweight title, Trans-Tasman super middleweight title, Australian super middleweight title, and inaugural Commonwealth super middleweight title, and was a challenger for the International Boxing Organization (IBO) super middleweight title against Rick Thornberry, and inaugural Pan Asian Boxing Association (PABA) light heavyweight title against Anthony Bigeni, his professional fighting weight varied from , i.e. super middleweight to , i.e. cruiserweight.

Professional boxing record

References

External links

1968 births
Cruiserweight boxers
Light-heavyweight boxers
Living people
Place of birth missing (living people)
Boxers from Melbourne
Super-middleweight boxers
Australian male boxers
Commonwealth Boxing Council champions